FC Polyot Bishkek is a Kyrgyzstani football club based in Bishkek, Kyrgyzstan that played in the top division in Kyrgyzstan, the Kyrgyzstan League.

History 
1997: Founded as SC Sverdlovskogo RUVD Bishkek.
1999: Renamed FC Polyot Bishkek.
2003: Renamed with Dinamo-Erkin Farm Bishkek to FC Dinamo-Polyot Bishkek.

Achievements 
Kyrgyzstan League:
3rd: 2000

Current squad

External links 
Career stats by KLISF

Football clubs in Kyrgyzstan
Football clubs in Bishkek
1997 establishments in Kyrgyzstan
2003 disestablishments in Kyrgyzstan
Association football clubs established in 1997
Association football clubs disestablished in 2003